Sun Sinan (born 2 October 1988, Anshan) is a Chinese field hockey player. At the 2012 Summer Olympics she competed with the China women's national field hockey team in the women's tournament.

References

External links
 

1988 births
Living people
Chinese female field hockey players
Asian Games gold medalists for China
Asian Games medalists in field hockey
Field hockey players at the 2010 Asian Games
Field hockey players at the 2012 Summer Olympics
Medalists at the 2010 Asian Games
Olympic field hockey players of China
Sportspeople from Anshan
21st-century Chinese women